Zerifa Wahid is an Indian actress known for her works in Assamese films. Her prominent features include Baandhon, which won the 60th National Film Awards for Best Feature Film in Assamese directed by Jahnu Baruah. and the best film in the Indian Films Competition held at the Bengaluru International Film Festival for the year 2012.

Career 

Zerifa Wahid started her career in acting as a child actor by making her debut in the Assamese Feature film Abhimaan in 1990. Alongside her brilliant academic career, she managed to continue with her passion for acting and worked as a leading Heroine in numerous Assamese Feature Films, Television Serials, Video Films, Music albums and TV commercials. A very young, school going Zerifa played leading heroine in films like Agnigarh, Atikram, Dhua etc. She played the lead heroine in Zubeen Garg's Tumi Mor Mathu Mor. and became known for playing characters which were modern and progressive in outlook. Some of her successful films are Seuji Dharani Dhuniya, Anya Ek Jatra, Gun Gun Gane Gane, Agnisakhi (for which she was awarded Best Actress by the Govt. of Assam), Nayak, Kadambari, Prem Geet, Deuta Diya Bidai and Ahir Bhairav etc. In Antaheen Jatra, Zerifa showed the beauty of a rural girl in bare minimum make-up. Ahir Bhairav, where Zerifa played a schizophrenic, is the first Assamese feature film to be shot entirely in London.

Zerifa Wahid has branched out in many sectors of social works, film and theatre productions. Zerifa is the Ambassador for Assam Autism Foundation and Special Olympics Bharat (Assam Chapter). She also endorses the IT brand Datamation.

Jahnu Baruah's  Baandhon was the Inaugural film in the Indian Panoroma section in the International Film Festival of India, Goa 2012, which also won the National Awards (Rajat Kamal) as the best regional film, and Bidyut Chakravarty's Dwaar released in 2013 received wide critical acclaim.

Her film Raag: The Rhythm of Love with Adil Hussain, Kopil Bora and Kenny Basumatary released on 7 February 2014 in Assam, was released by PVR Cinemas nationwide on 7 March 2014.

Zerifa Wahid's latest feature film to be released in June 2016 named Kothanodi: The River of Fables directed by Bhaskar Hazarika and starring Adil Hussain, Seema Biswas, Kopil Bora and others won the post -production grant and was premiered in the Busan International Film Festival in Oct 2015. The film was also officially screened in the BFI London Film Festival, MAMI Mumbai International Film Festival, Gothenburg Film Festival and many other prestigious film festivals across the globe.

Feature film Kothanodi: The River of Fables wins the Rajat Kamal for Best Film in Assamese language in the 63rd National Film Award 2016.

Zerifa Wahid Productions 
Zerifa Wahid is the first heroine of Assamese Cinema to have launched her own production house; "Zerifa Wahid Productions". Being very intimately associated with the theatre movement in Assam with powerful performances in several stage plays and who loves to call herself a "Theatre Worker", Zerifa has successfully acted and produced well-known Stage Plays like Girish Karnad's The Fire And The Rain, the Assamese version of which was named Agnibrishti, British dramatist's Peter Shaffer's Five Finger Exercise, the Assamese Adaptation of which was named Pancharatna, Girish Karnad's "Nagamandala" etc. Nagamandala was selected in the "Mahrindra Excellence in Theatre Awards 2012" with ten nominations and was staged in Delhi on 5 March 2012. Purush, a play by Padmashree Arun Sharma was staged in 2012 under the banner of her production. In June 2013, Zerifa Wahid Production staged another very noteworthy play of Padmashri Arun Sarma named "NAPOLEON" at Rabindra Bhawan, Guwahati. The several shows of "NAPOLEON" won unprecedented response from the audience and media acclaim. Continuing with its tradition, Zerifa Wahid Production launched its latest play "MOROMOR BONDHU", an adaptation of A. R. Gurney's "LOVE LETTERS" in Assamese on 25 July 2014 in Guwahati.

Enlarging its creative endeavour, Zerifa Wahid Production introduced a festival of plays in the months of November and December 2014 named as "JUST THEATRE" in Guwahati. It showcased three plays namely, Girish Karnad's    Nagamandala  and Padmashri Arun Sara's  Napoleon  and A. R. Gurney's   Love Letters  in its Assamese adaptation named as
Moromor Bondhu .

In 2015, Zerifa Wahid Production produced the Assamese Adaptation of Girish Karnad's very popular play, "WEDDING ALBUM". The several shows of the play was hugely enjoyed by the theatre lovers of Assam.

In March 2016, Zerifa Wahid Production premiered the English version of A.R. Gurney's "LOVE LETTERS" retaining the adapted name "MOROMOR BONDHU".

The production house is making preparation for its newest venture for the year 2016.

Filmography

References

External links 

 

Actresses from Assam
Actresses in Assamese cinema
Indian film actresses
Living people
Year of birth missing (living people)